Loris Reina (born 10 June 1980) is a French football player who last played for the Belgian club, KV Kortrijk.

Career 
The left back has previously played for Olympique Marseille. After three seasons, the 29-year-old French defender has left SV Zulte-Waregem to sign for KV Kortrijk on 19 June 2009.

References

1980 births
Living people
French footballers
Ligue 1 players
Olympique de Marseille players
AS Nancy Lorraine players
Servette FC players
R. Charleroi S.C. players
S.V. Zulte Waregem players
K.V. Kortrijk players
Association football defenders
Mediterranean Games bronze medalists for France
Mediterranean Games medalists in football
Competitors at the 2001 Mediterranean Games